Adelaide Lawson (June 9, 1889October 28, 1986) was an American artist known for her modernist oil paintings of landscapes and figures. She was said to possess an ability to build surface harmony through the use of flat, shadowless forms of generalized color and to use distortion and silhouetted patterning so as to give observers a sense of animation and often amusement.

Art training
During the second decade of the twentieth century Lawson studied at the Art Students League of New York under Kenneth Hayes Miller. Along with other students of Miller she later studied under Hamilton Easter Field at his Ogunquit School of Painting and Sculpture in Ogunquit, Maine.

Artistic career
Lawson's first public exhibition was in New York at the MacDowell Club in November 1916. A year later her name first appeared in issues of the American Art Directory and in 1918 her work appeared in three group shows: in March she showed at the Art Alliance of America, of which she was a member, and in December she appeared for a second time at the MacDowell Club and, once again, at the Art Alliance. A year later she was referred to as a "prominent painter" during a group exhibition that included her work. A critic pronounced the landscapes she contributed to that show as imaginative and decorative. During the 1920s she exhibited frequently, appearing in group shows at the Touchstone and Powell Galleries (1921), the gallery of Louise Upton Brumback (1923), the Twelfth Street Gallery (1923), G.R.D. Studio (1929), Art Students' League (1929), and Brooklyn Society of Modern Artists (1929).

In 1922 Lawson contributed a painting to a group exhibition held at a high school art studio in Washington, D.C. Because the show had been organized by African Americans, was located in a segregated school, and consisted largely of African American participants, Lawson's name has appeared in lists of African American artists. Lawson was not African American but supported the rights of African Americans and participated in the New Negro movement of her time. In 1923 her work appeared for the first time at the Whitney Studio Club in a show that also included paintings by John Dos Passos and sculptures by Reuben Nakian. Dos Passos, who was a close friend of Lawson's, had taken classes with her at the Art Students' League and Field's Thurnscoe School of Modern Art in Ogunquit, Maine. A critic noted that one of the landscapes she showed was fanciful and another quite sombre. In 1924 and 1925 Lawson showed twice more with Dos Passos at the Whitney Studio Club. Regarding the 1925 show, a critic called Lawson's paintings strange and unpleasantly eccentric.

In the early 1920s Lawson participated in shows of the Society of Independent Artists and when Hamilton Easter Field broke away from that organization to found the Salons of America she not only joined it but became one of its directors. In 1926 she became a founding member of the New York Society of Women Artists and afterwards regularly participated in its exhibitions.

In 1925 Lawson was given her first solo as the inaugural exhibition of Gallery 134 on West 4th Street. In his review of the show the critic for the New York Sun commented on the nonchalance of her work, showing a "sort of indifference to the things one usually finds in paintings" and said she painted "decidedly, with a fine detachment." The New York Evening Posts critic, Margaret Breuning, noted an unevenness in technical ability, but praised the "power of design and concentration that gives vitality to all the canvases" and called attention to Lawson's sense of humor which "gives back amusement to the beholder." A critic for the New York Sun wrote that her work stood out distinctly in a group show at G.R.D. Studio in 1929 and said "She has a peculiarly loose way of painting that certainly approaches jazz. At first it seems lazy and shiftless, but it grows on acquaintance, and finally it is possible to suspect that there is something natively American in the style.

During the 1930s and succeeding decades Lawson's work appeared less frequently than it had in the 1920s. She and her husband and their two children left Manhattan to settle in a small community on Long Island's north shore and, while she continued to paint, she participated only occasionally in public exhibitions.

When Lawson was 93 a critic summarized her life's work by describing the particular "vivacity, energy and dynamism" of her modernist style which set her apart from other artists and showed her uniquely American outlook. The critic described Lawson's method as "abstracting rhythms, simplifying descriptions, flattening, generalizing color, eliminating shadow and building an emphatic surface harmony between forms." Noting Lawson's exuberance and spontaneity, she wrote: "Occasionally viewers will associate the weightlessness of form with fantasy, innocence or naïveté. The intention, however, is to emphasize the power of direct landscape sensation." Four years later Lawson's obituary added to this overview that she and her husband had "spearheaded the modernist movement in the early years of this century."

Exhibitions
Lawson's work appeared frequently in group shows held by the Whitney Studio Club, Society of Independent Artists, Salons of America, and New York Society of Women Artists. She was also shown by the Touchstone Gallery, Powell Art Gallery, the Twelfth Street Gallery, Pennsylvania Academy of Fine Arts, J. Wanamaker Gallery of Modern Decorative Art, and the Downtown and Midtown Galleries in New York. She appeared in special exhibitions at the G.R.D. Studio, Art Students' League, Brooklyn Society of Modern Artists, Louise Upton Brumback's gallery, by the Tanner Art League, and in Madrid, Spain. She is a standout at a 1929 G.R.D. Studio group exhibition alongside Mildred Crooks, Doris Rosenthal, and Agnes Weinrich. She was given solo exhibitions in 1925 at Gallery 134 in New York and the Lakewood Gallery, Glen Cove, Long Island.

Memberships
Lawson belonged to the Society of Independent Artists, Salons of America (as director), New York Society of Women Artists, Art Alliance of America, Hempstead Harbor Artists Association, and The Dialis.

Personal information
Lawson's birth name is given as Adelaide Jaffery Lawson.  She was born in New York on June 9, 1889. Her father was S. Levy Lawson. Born Simeon Levy, he had obtained a legal change of name to Simeon Levy Lawson shortly after Lawson's birth and it is thus likely that her name at birth and for the next few months was Adelaide Jaffery Levy. Simeon Levy's choice of name was influenced by his profession. A journalist who traveled frequently, he changed his name to overcome discrimination that he encountered on the assumption that he was a Jew. The new name he chose bore close similarity to the name of a well-known newspaperman, Edward Levy-Lawson, owner of the (London) The Daily Telegraph. Lawson's mother was Belle Hart Lawson. Although Lawson's grandparents on her father's side were Russian-Polish Jews and those on her mother's were German Jews, her parents were Christian Scientists and, on that account, did not seek medical treatment when Belle contracted breast cancer. She died of the disease in November 1901 when Lawson was twelve years old. Lawson had two brothers, Wendell Holmes and John Howard. They were named after men whom their mother especially respected: the jurist, Oliver Wendell Holmes, and the prison reformer, John Howard. Lawson herself was named after a socially-active friend of her mother. Wendell Lawson, who became a chemist and chemical importer, committed suicide at the age of 33 in 1922. John Howard Lawson (1894–1977) was a playwright, screenwriter, and theatrical producer who joined the Communist Party during the 1930s and in 1950 was jailed for contempt of Congress after refusing to testify before the House Committee on Un-American Activities. Lawson's parents were affluent, her father through his success as a newspaperman and her mother as daughter of a prosperous German industrialist and, while both parents believed in social reform, her mother was particularly devoted to progressive causes, including women's rights and liberalized early childhood education.

Lawson received part of her early education in at an experimental school, the Children's Playhouse, during a period in which her family was living in the New York suburb of New Rochelle,. After her mother's death in 1901, Lawson's father, who traveled frequently and who, when present, was not a warm and loving parent, employed a governess and other servants to look after her and her brothers. That year he enrolled her and John Howard as boarding students at the Halstead School in Yonkers and, in the summer of 1906, when she was 17, he sent her with John Howard, on an extensive tour of England, Germany, and the Netherlands.

Reflecting the family's relatively high social position Lawson's name appeared in the society pages of New York newspapers during her teenage years.

While young, Lawson lived in and around New York City. Lawson's father bought and sold real estate as an investment and the family moved frequently among properties that he owned. During the early stages of her career as a professional artist she lived in New York first with her father, then, after her brother John's marriage, with him and his wife, and then on her own in an apartment on 14th Street near Union Square.

Lawson traveled in Germany, France, England, and Switzerland during 1908, in 1920 she visited France and Spain, and in 1921 she traveled in France, the British Isles, Switzerland, and Italy.

During the 1920s Lawson's contemporaries saw her as lovably gypsy-like and one maintained that she "had never been taught to wash her ears and neck." Some critics of the time saw her paintings as similarly exotic, eccentric, nonchalant, and "curiously untidy."

Lawson married fellow artist Wood Gaylor on August 7, 1926. They had known each other for some years as students and participants in New York arts organizations. They remained married until Gaylor's death in 1957.

During the early years of their marriage they lived in Greenwich Village. Lawson and Gaylor had two sons, Wynn Lawson Gaylor, born circa 1927, and Randall, born circa 1930. Gaylor had a daughter by a previous marriage who lived with her mother. In 1930 their home comprised the three of them and a live-in servant. After spending summer vacations in Glenwood Landing for two years, they moved permanently to that Long Island village in 1934 and Lawson remained there following Gaylor's death in 1957. While continuing to pursue her artistic career she participated in community activities from time to time. When she died at Huntington Hospital, Long Island, on October 28, 1986, the obituary writer for the New York Times gave her married name as "Gaylord."Other names'

Lawson sometimes used her middle initial, but not her middle name. Sources give this middle name as Jaffery, Jeffrey, Geoffery, or Jaffrey.  Although she used Lawson as her professional name, her married name occurs in press reports as Adelaide Lawson Gaylord, Adelaide L. Gaylord, or simply Adelaide Gaylord.

Notes

References

Painters from New York City
20th-century American painters
20th-century American women artists
Modern painters
1889 births
1986 deaths
Art Students League of New York alumni
Society of Independent Artists
American women painters